Das Leben Jesu may refer to:

Das Leben Jesu kritisch bearbeitet David Strauss (section Das Leben Jesu)  Tübingen 1835
Life of Jesus (Hegel) (German: Das Leben Jesu), A German book of G. W. F. Hegel
 Das Leben Jesu Christoph Friedrich von Ammon 1842